The saturation vapor density (SVD) is the maximum density of water vapor in air at a given temperature. The concept is related to saturation vapor pressure (SVP). As relative humidity is a dimensionless quantity (often expressed in terms of a percentage), vapor density can be stated in units of grams or kilograms per cubic meter. 

Thus, setting  to 1 cubic meter, we get  =  = density.

The values shown at hyperphysics-sources indicate that the saturated vapor density is 4.85 g/m3 at 273 K, at which the saturated vapor pressure is 4.58 mm of Hg or 610.616447 Pa (760 mm of Hg ≈ 1 atm = 1.01325 * 105 Pa).

Therefore, for particular mole number and volume the saturated vapor pressure will not change if the temperature remains constant.

References

Atmospheric thermodynamics
Thermodynamic properties